Shoreline Christian School is a private Christian school located in Shoreline, Washington, a suburb of Seattle. The school serves pre-kindergarten through 12th grade (PK–12). Shoreline Christian is affiliated with the Christian Reformed Church but students come from many other denominations.

Mission statement
Shoreline Christian School works in partnership with Christian families and their church to challenge students in preschool through high school:
To celebrate that all of creation belongs to God
To respond to God by developing their unique gifts and abilities
To live as dynamic and transforming influences for the glory of God

History
Reference: 
1952: The school was founded in 1952 by the Christian Education Society of Seattle under the name of Calvin Christian School. The Rev. Watson Groen died in that year and the name of the school was changed to Watson Groen Christian School. The school began with students in grades 1–8 under the tutelage of the first teacher, Miss Parker. The first classes were conducted in the home of Howard and Genevieve Long.

1953: The first school building was constructed with two classrooms at the present address.

1958: The first class of high school seniors graduated. School enrollment was 108 students.

1965: Kindergarten classes were added.

1967: The new high school building was completed.

1977: The new gymnasium was dedicated.

1996: The school gained accreditation by the Northwest Association of Schools and Colleges.

1997: The name of the school was changed to Shoreline Christian School.

High school sports
Reference:
Baseball
Basketball
Golf
Soccer
Track
Volleyball

References

External links
Shoreline Christian School

Christian schools in Washington (state)
Schools in King County, Washington
Private high schools in Washington (state)
High schools in King County, Washington
Shoreline, Washington
Private middle schools in Washington (state)
Private elementary schools in Washington (state)